Tapihritsa or Tapahritsa (c 7th ~ 8th century)  was a Bon practitioner who achieved the Dzogchen mastery of the rainbow body and consequently, as a fully realised trikaya Buddha, is invoked as an iṣṭadevatā by Dzogchen practitioners in both Bon and Tibetan Buddhism. He is known for his achievement of the rainbow body.

The historical Tapihritsa was born in Zhangzhung to a family of nomads. Tapihritsa's principal teacher was Dawa Gyaltsen.

Tapihritsa was contemporaneous with Ligmincha, King of Zhangzhung, and Trisong Detsen, Emperor of Tibet.

Tapihritsa is often visualized as representing the realization of all the masters of the Zhangzhung Whispered Transmission lineage, one of the three Bon Dzogchen lineages.

Works

Tapihritsa's primary notable work is The Twenty-One Nails (rdzogs pa chen po zhang zhung snyan rgyud las gzer bu gnyis shu rtsa gcig). There are two translations of this text and commentary into English, as follows:

  - a translation of Tapihritsa's The Twenty-One Nails.

Notes

References

Further reading

External links
The Invocation of Tapihritsa, by Nangzher Lopo 

Bon
Bon deities
Dzogchen lamas
Dzogchen practices
Dzogchen lineages
Tibetan Buddhists from Tibet
Yidams